Boundy is a surname. Notable people with the surname include:

Craig Boundy (born 1974), British corporate executive
David Boundy (1932–2003), Australian politician
Gerald Boundy (1895–1964), English cricketer

See also
Sirifila-Boundy, commune in the Ségou Region of Mali